Midland University is a private Lutheran university in Fremont, Nebraska.  It has an approximate enrollment of 1,600 students on  campus. Known as Midland Lutheran College from 1962 to 2010, the college is affiliated with the Evangelical Lutheran Church in America.

History
Midland University was founded as an educational institution in 1883 as Luther Academy. The original building, located in Wahoo, Nebraska, was dedicated on November 10, 1883, the 400th anniversary of Martin Luther’s birth. The current junior college is also a product of Midland College, an institution founded in 1887 by the General Synod of the Evangelical Lutheran Church. Midland College, originally located in Atchison, Kansas, moved to the junior college's current location in Fremont, Nebraska in 1919.  Luther Academy, later named Luther College, combined with Midland College as Midland Lutheran College in 1962.

In 2009, the Midland Lutheran College had a seven figure financial deficit and its lowest enrollment since WWII, at 598.

Following the closure of nearby Dana College in 2010, Midland Lutheran College allowed former Dana students to transfer all Dana credits, honored all Dana academic, athletic and need-based scholarships and grants and waived enrollment deposits for Dana students. Of the roughly 600 Dana students, approximately 275 enrolled at Midland in the fall of 2010.

Midland Lutheran College was renamed Midland University in 2010. Along with the name change, the institution also changed its official colors from black and orange to navy blue and orange. In order to attract students, the junior college also began investing in new programs and athletic teams in 2010. In 2010, the institution added five new varsity and club teams, including men's and women's wrestling, men's and women's bowling, competitive cheer/dance, and women's lacrosse. In 2011–12, according to government statistics, Midland spent $5.5 million on athletic scholarships and operations and received $9.5 million in tuition and fees paid by athletes.

In 2011, Midland introduced a program guaranteeing that participating students would graduate in four years. The school's freshman enrollment increased by 32% from fall 2011 to fall 2012; then-president Ben Sasse (who would go on to serve as United States senator from Nebraska from 2015 to 2023) attributed this growth, in part, to the new policy.

In 2012, it added varsity men's and women's shotgun sports. In 2013, the junior college added varsity men's and women's ice hockey. These additions brought the school's total number of varsity sports programs to 27 as of 2013.

From the fall of 2009 to the fall of 2013, Midland's enrollment more than doubled from a low of 590 in 2009 to 1,288 in 2013. During the same time, Midland went “from a seven-figure deficit to seven-figure surpluses.”

Academics
Midland University offers bachelor's degrees in more than thirty fields of study as well as three master's degrees.

In 2010, the school claimed to have a graduate placement rate of 100% for nursing students and 90% for education students.

In addition to offering Master of Education in Leadership and Master of Professional Accounting degrees, the junior college announced the offering of an MBA program in 2012.

In 2012, the school's accrediting agency, the Higher Learning Commission, placed it "on notice", expressing "concerns related to the University's finances and planning and its processes for assessment and utilization of student learning outcomes". The HLC called for Midland to file final reports in 2014, demonstrating that these concerns had been resolved. In November 2014, the Higher Learning Commission confirmed that its concerns were resolved by removing the “on notice” sanction.

Student activities
Midland University offers over 45 student clubs and organizations and several intramural sports offerings, including basketball, sand-volleyball, dodgeball, ultimate-frisbee, and softball.
The university has six social fraternities and sororities: Beta Sigma Psi fraternity; Sigma Rho fraternity; Kappa Phi fraternity; Phi Omega sorority; Pi Epsilon sorority; and Tri Phi sorority.  Other student organizations include Phi Beta Lambda – Students in Free Enterprise (PBL- SIFE), Student Art Association, Campus Crusades for Christ, Student Education Association, Blue Key, Cardinal Key, Anderson Scholar Leaders, Student Ambassadors, and Short Attention Span.

Athletics
The Midland athletic teams are called the Warriors. The university is a member of the National Association of Intercollegiate Athletics (NAIA), primarily competing in the Great Plains Athletic Conference (GPAC) for most of its sports since the 1969–70 academic year. The university's official colors are navy blue and orange.

Midland competes in 33 intercollegiate varsity sports: Men's sports include baseball, basketball, bowling, cross country, football, golf, ice hockey, lacrosse, powerlifting, soccer, swimming & diving, tennis, track and field (indoor and outdoor) and wrestling; while women's sports include basketball, bowling, cross country, flag football, golf, ice hockey, lacrosse, powerlifting, soccer, softball, swimming & diving, tennis, track and field (indoor and outdoor), volleyball and wrestling; and co-ed sports include cheerleading, dance, eSports and shotgun sports.

History
Midland (then a junior college) expanded the athletic department in the last decade. Midland has added men's and women's lacrosse, men's and women's bowling, men's and women's wrestling, shotgun sports, men's and women's ice hockey, women's flag football, powerlifting, men's and women's swimming, and eSports since 2010.

Accomplishments
The Warriors softball team appeared in two Women's College World Series (WCWS) in 1970 and 1971. The Midland Wildfire dance team has won the Great Plains Athletic Conference title from 2014 to 2019, and the 2017 and 2019 NAIA national title.

After a six-day shoot at the ACUI National Championships, Midland University emerged as the 2017 Division II National Champions. Midland University won both the men's and women's raw titles at the 2019 USA Powerlifting Collegiate Nationals. This makes back-to-back national championships for the men, while the women earn their first national title. In its second year of competition, Midland University's powerlifting team won its first national championship, winning the 2018 USA Powerlifting Men's Raw Collegiate National title.

The NAIA announced the Scholar-Teams for the 2016–17 academic year. Midland's (Neb.) women's volleyball team, Arizona Christian's women's cross country team, and Indiana Tech's women's golf team and  all tied with a NAIA-best combined grade point average of 3.90 this year. The three teams have been selected to share the title of Scholar-Team of the Year.

Notable alumni
 Jim Buchanan, baseball player
 Jon Christensen, politician
 Howard Hanson, composer, director of the Eastman School of Music
 Clifton Hillegass, publisher, creator of CliffsNotes
 Gwen Howard, politician
 Toni Jeričević, actor, TV host
 Henry Margenau, physicist
 George Mendenhall, professor, Lutheran theologian
 Paul Norris, comic book artist, creator of Aquaman

References

External links

 Official website
 Official athletics website

 
Buildings and structures in Dodge County, Nebraska
Education in Dodge County, Nebraska
Educational institutions established in 1883
Private universities and colleges in Nebraska
1883 establishments in Nebraska
Great Plains Athletic Conference schools